Aurora is a home rule municipality located in Arapahoe, Adams, and Douglas counties, Colorado, United States. The city's population was 386,261 at the 2020 United States Census with 336,035 residing in Arapahoe County, 47,720 residing in Adams County, and 2,506 residing in Douglas County. Aurora is the third most populous city in the State of Colorado and the 51st most populous city in the United States. Aurora is a principal city of the Denver–Aurora–Lakewood Metropolitan Statistical Area (MSA) and a major city of the Front Range Urban Corridor.

History

Before European settlement, the land that now makes up Aurora was the territory of the Arapaho, Cheyenne, Núu-agha-tʉvʉ-pʉ̱ (Ute), and Očeti Šakówiŋ (Sioux) tribes.
Aurora originated in the 1880s as the town of Fletcher, taking its name from Denver businessman Donald Fletcher who saw it as a real estate opportunity. At that point Fletcher skipped town, leaving the community with a huge water debt. Inhabitants decided to rename the town Aurora in 1907, after one of the subdivisions composing the town, and Aurora slowly began to grow in Denver's shadow becoming the fastest-growing city in the United States during the late 1970s and early 1980s. Aurora, composed of hundreds of subdivisions, thus carries the name of one of the original development plats from which it sprang.

Aurora's growing population in recent decades has led to efforts for co-equal recognition with its larger neighbor. Former mayor Dennis Champine once expressed the somewhat whimsical notion that eventually the area would be called the "Aurora/Denver Metropolitan Area". Indeed, since the 2000 Census Aurora has surpassed Denver in land area, and much of Aurora is undeveloped, while Denver is more fully built-out. However, such efforts are somewhat hampered by the lack of a large, historically important central business district in the city. Aurora is largely suburban in character, as evidenced by the city's modest number of multi-story buildings.

A large military presence has existed in Aurora since the early 20th century. In 1918, Army General Hospital #21 (later renamed Fitzsimons Army Hospital) opened, with the U.S. government expanding and upgrading the hospital facilities in 1941 just in time to care for the wounded servicemen of World War II. Lowry Air Force Base was opened in 1938, straddling the border of Aurora and Denver. It eventually closed in 1994, and has been redeveloped into a master-planned community featuring residential, commercial, business and educational facilities. In 1942, the Army Air Corps built Buckley Field, which has been renamed Naval Air Station, Buckley Air National Guard Base, Buckley Air Force Base, and finally Buckley Space Force Base. The base, home of the Buckley Garrison and the 140th Wing Colorado Air National Guard, is Aurora's largest employer.

President Warren G. Harding visited Fitzsimons Army Hospital in 1923, and President Franklin D. Roosevelt visited in 1936. In 1943 the hospital was the birthplace of 2004 Democratic presidential candidate John Kerry. President Dwight D. Eisenhower recovered from a heart attack at Fitzsimons for seven weeks during the fall of 1955. Decommissioned in 1999, the facility is part of the Anschutz Medical Campus of the University of Colorado Denver, and the Fitzsimons Life Science District. The Anschutz Medical Campus also includes the University of Colorado Hospital, which moved to Aurora from Denver in 2007, and the Children's Hospital. The first carbon-ion radiotherapy research and treatment facility in the U.S. has been proposed at the site. These facilities will employ a workforce of 32,000 at build-out.

In 1965, mayor Norma O. Walker became the first woman to head a U.S. city with a population over 60,000.

In 1978, the cult coming-of-age film Over the Edge was filmed in Aurora; the crime drama has been named the “signature film” of Denver.

In 1979, it was announced that a science fiction theme park would be built in Aurora using the sets of a $50 million film based on the fantasy novel Lord of Light. However, due to legal problems the project was never completed. The script of the unmade film project, renamed Argo, was used as cover for the "Canadian Caper": the exfiltration of six U.S. diplomatic staff trapped by the Iranian hostage crisis.

In 1993, Cherry Creek State Park on the southwestern edge of Aurora was the location for the papal mass of the 8th World Youth Day with Pope John Paul II, attended by an estimated 500,000 people.

Aurora is split among three counties and lies distant from the respective county seats. A consolidated city and county government such as those found elsewhere in Colorado (Denver and Broomfield) was considered in the mid-1990s but failed to win approval by city voters; the issue was reconsidered in 2006.

Aurora Sports Park opened in 2003. In 2004, Aurora was honored as the Sports Illustrated magazine's 50th Anniversary "Sportstown" for Colorado because of its exemplary involvement in facilitating and enhancing sports. The city attracts more than 30 regional and national sports tournaments annually to Aurora's fields, which include the  Aurora's active populace is also reflected in the variety of professional athletes hailing from the city. Aurora's first semi-professional sports franchise, the Aurora Cavalry in the International Basketball League, began play in 2006 but folded by season's end due to budget mishaps.

In 2008, Aurora was designated an All-America City by the National Civic League.

Aurora pioneered the use of bank filtration in the United States, becoming one of the first U.S. cities to reap the benefits of siphoning water from beneath a riverbed upon completion of the Prairie Waters Project in 2010.

In 2017, the Republic of El Salvador opened a consulate in Aurora, serving Colorado, Kansas, Nebraska, and Wyoming.

Aurora theater shooting

On July 20, 2012, Aurora was the site of the deadliest shooting by a lone shooter in Colorado (and the state's overall second deadliest, after the 1999 Columbine High School massacre). The shooting occurred just after midnight, when James Holmes opened fire during the midnight premiere of The Dark Knight Rises in a Century movie theater, killing 12 people and injuring 70 others. Holmes was arrested and was eventually sentenced to 12 life sentences in prison with an additional required 3,318 years. The shooting drew an international response from world leaders. U.S. President Barack Obama visited victims, as well as local and state officials, and addressed the nation in a televised address from Aurora on July 22. Actor Christian Bale, who plays Batman in the film, also visited some victims in hospitals. The events marked a turning point in recognition and public perception of the city; rather than referring to the site as being in "Denver" or "suburban Denver", as would have been typical before the event, virtually all media accounts of the incident unequivocally named "Aurora" as its location.

Elijah McClain

On August 30, 2019, Aurora African-American massage therapist Elijah McClain died six days after an incident with three Aurora police officers. On June 27, 2020, Aurora Police in riot gear dispersed thousands of protestors in the Violin Protest of the death of Elijah McClain.

Geography

At the 2020 United States Census, the city had a total area of  including  of water. The city is about 5 percent more extensive than neighboring Denver and ranks as the 56th largest U.S. city in land area.

Neighborhoods
Aurora is composed of dozens of neighborhoods, districts and (current and former) military installations. Among them:

 Aurora Heights
 The Aurora Highlands
 Adonea
 Aurora Hills
 Aurora Knolls
 Beacon Point
 Berkshire Village
 Blackstone
 Brookvale
 Buckley Space Force Base
 Carriage Place
 Chadsford
 Chaddsford Village
 Chambers Heights
 Chelsea
 Cinnamon Village II
 Conservatory
 Copperleaf
 Corning
 Crestridge
 Cross Creek
 The Dam East
 Del Mar
 The Dam West
 Downtown A-Town (the Fletcher townsite, Aurora's "downtown")
 Eastridge
 East Quincy Highlands
 Fitzsimons Campus
 Fox Hill
 Greenfield
 Hallcraft's Village East
 Hampton Hills
 Havana Heights
 Heather Gardens
 Heather Ridge
 Heritage Eagle Bend Golf Club
 Highline Villages
 Highpoint
 Hillside at Del Mar
 Hoffman Heights
 Hutchinson Heights
 Inspiration
 Jackson Farm
 Kingsborough
 Laredo-Highline
 Lowry Campus (formerly Lowry Air Force Base)
 Lynn Knoll
 Meadowood
 Meadow Hills
 Mission Viejo
 Morris Heights
 Murphy Creek
 Peoria Park
 Pheasant Run
 Piney Creek
 Ponderosa Ridge
 Pride's Crossing
 Ptarmigan Park
 Queensborough
 Quincy Hill
 Rocking Horse
 Saddle Rock
 Settler's Village
 Serenity Ridge
 Seven Hills
 Shenandoah
 Stapleton (a portion of the redevelopment of Denver's former airport lies in Aurora, directly north of Original Aurora)
 Siena
 Smoky Hill
 Smoky Ridge
 Sterling Hills
 Stricker's House
 Summer Valley Ranch
 Tallgrass
 Tallyn's Reach
 The Timbers
 Tollgate Run at Kingsborough
 Tollgate Village
 Traditions
 Tuscany
 Utah Park
 Village East
 Waters Edge
 Wheatlands
 Whispering Pines
 Willow Park
 Willow Trace
 Woodgate
 Woodrim

Surrounding municipalities

Climate
Aurora experiences a semi-arid climate (Köppen climate classification BSk), with four distinct seasons and modest precipitation year-round. Summers range from mild to hot, with generally low humidity and frequent afternoon thunderstorms, and Aurora also averages about one dozen tornado warnings throughout tornado season, running from April–July. Although a touchdown does occur every couple of years, tornadoes are typically weak and short lived. Aurora residents typically hear the tornado sirens go off numerous times more than residents in Denver, to the West. All of Aurora is located east of I-25, where tornado alley begins. Hailstorms, at times 1–2'+ deep happen on occasion, and typical hailstorms are very common throughout these months. Winters range from mild to occasional bitter cold, with periods of sunshine alternating with periods of snow, high winds and very low temperatures. The average first snowfall in the Aurora area occurs in late October and the average final snowfall occurs in late April, although snow has fallen as early as September 4 and as late as June 5. Generally, deciduous trees in the area are bare from mid October to late April.

Demographics

As of the 2010 census, there were 325,078 people, 121,191 households, and 73,036 families residing in the city. The racial makeup of the city was 61.1% White, 15.7% African American, 4.9% Asian (1.1% Korean, 0.8% Vietnamese, 0.5% Filipino, 0.5% Chinese, 0.5% Indian, 0.2% Japanese, 0.1% Thai, 0.1% Cambodian, 0.1% Burmese, 0.1% Nepalese, 0.1% Pakistani, 0.1% Indonesian), 1.0% Native American, 0.3% Pacific Islander, 11.6% from other races, and 5.2% from two or more races. Hispanic or Latino of any race were 28.7% of the population; 21.9% of Aurora's population is of Mexican heritage, 1.0% Salvadoran, 0.7% Puerto Rican, 0.4% Guatemalan, 0.3% Honduran, 0.3% Peruvian, 0.2% Cuban, 0.2% Colombian and 0.1% Nicaraguan. Non-Hispanic Whites were 47.3% of the population in 2010, compared to 85.1% in 1980.

Aurora is a center of Colorado's refugee population. There are about 30,000 Ethiopians and Eritreans living in the Denver–Aurora area. There is also a sizable population of Nepalese refugees.

There were 121,191 households, out of which 35.5% had children under the age of 18 living with them, 46.9% were married couples living together, 13.1% had a female householder with no husband present, and 34.8% were non-families. 27.4% of all households were made up of individuals, and 5.7% had someone living alone who was 65 years of age or older.  The average household size was 2.6 and the average family size was 3.2.

In the city, the population was spread out, with 27.3% under the age of 18, 6.8% from 18 to 24, 37.6% from 25 to 44, 16.8% from 45 to 64, and 8.9% who were 65 years of age or older. The median age was 32 years. For every 100 females, there were 100.5 males. For every 100 females age 18 and over, there were 95.8 males.

The median income for a household in the city was $46,507, and the median income for a family was $52,551. Males had a median income of $35,963 versus $30,080 for females. The per capita income for the city was $21,095. About 6.8% of families and 8.9% of the population were below the poverty line, including 12.0% of those under age 18 and 6.1% of those age 65 or over.

Economy
According to the Aurora Economic Development Council, the largest public employers in the city are:

According to the Aurora Economic Development Council, the largest private employers in the city of Aurora are:

Other notable employers in the city include Lockheed Martin Corporation, Staples Inc., United Natural Foods, Aurora Mental Health Center, G45 Secure Solutions, Graebel Relocation, Core-Mark, and Nelnet, Inc.

In 2020, German cleaning technology manufacturer Kärcher opened its North American headquarters in Aurora, on a new street named Kärcher Way.

Attractions
Aurora also is home to several privately owned golf courses including CommonGround Golf Course, Heather Ridge Country Club, Heritage Eagle Bend Golf Club and Valley Country Club.

Star K Ranch, home to Aurora's Morrison Nature Center, provides important habitat for wildlife. It has several trails for nature exploration, including access to the Sand Creek Greenway Trail. Jewell Wetland, a  wooded wetland, features trails, boardwalk/deck access into the wetland and a butterfly garden. Aurora Reservoir and Quincy Reservoir offer plenty of opportunities for outdoor water pursuits.

DeLaney Farm, site of Aurora's famous historic round barn, has  of open space, trails with access to the High Line Canal, an organic garden managed by Denver Urban Gardens, and two structures on the National Register of Historic Places.

Twenty-seven historic sites and landmarks are managed by the city of Aurora, including the Gully Homestead of 1870, the Victorian-style Centennial House of 1890, the privately owned American War Mothers National Memorial Home, the Art Deco-style KOA Building of 1934, the DeLaney Round Barn of 1902, Lowry Building 800, the interim headquarters for the U.S. Air Force Academy from 1955 to 1958, and Stanley Marketplace, which opened at the former site of Stanley Aviation in 2016.

The Aurora Fox Theatre & Arts Center, another historic landmark, is a 245-seat performing arts facility in the Aurora Cultural Arts District, along East Colfax Avenue. In that same area, The People's Building is a performing arts venue with flexible space, including 191 retractable seats and a gallery.

The Aurora History Museum is a community-based cultural center featuring a permanent exhibit on Aurora history and two changing exhibit galleries touching on topics related to history and decorative arts.

The Aurora Symphony Orchestra, a community orchestra established in 1978, offers a full season of full orchestra concerts annually as well as smaller chamber ensemble performances.

The Aurora Public Library serves its population, providing four main branches, four PC centers, and a variety of events throughout the year to its population.

Town Center at Aurora is the city's main shopping mall. Other shopping centers in Aurora include The Gardens on Havana (formerly Buckingham Square) and Southlands.

Government
The city of Aurora operates under a council-manager form of government, where the city manager runs the city's day-to-day operations with general guidance from the city council. The Aurora City Council is composed of a mayor and ten council members. Six members are elected from districts, while the other four are elected at large. The mayor is elected by the entire city. Aurora's mayor role is largely ceremonial, but the mayor does have direct impact on policy issues as the head of city council. The council is nonpartisan; however, parties of members have been listed below for reference.

This full-service city is protected by the Aurora Police Department, one of only 10 law enforcement agencies in Colorado to be accredited by the Commission on Accreditation for Law Enforcement Agencies; the Aurora Fire Department, which is accredited by the Commission on Fire Accreditation International; and a Public Safety Communications dispatch call center. The Aurora Municipal Courts handles a wide variety of offense violations, and the Aurora Detention Center is a 72-hour adult holding facility.

Politics

In national elections, Aurora leans to the left and the Democratic Party, though not as much as neighboring Denver but more than other suburbs in the Denver metro area. Northern and Central Aurora, due to an extremely racially and culturally diverse voter base and high density for a suburban city, are some of the most Democratic areas in Colorado and vote similarly to Denver and Boulder; southern Aurora, similar to neighboring Centennial, is more of a swing area and used to lean Republican, though it has swung Democratic as of late but not as much as areas more north of Interstate 225. 

Aurora anchors Colorado's 6th congressional district and is represented in Congress by Jason Crow (D-Centennial). State representation is listed in the tables below (areas implied to be in Arapahoe County unless noted: not all districts are fully in Aurora).

Colorado State Representatives

Colorado State Senators

List of mayors

Education

Primary and secondary education:
 Aurora Public Schools
 Cherry Creek Public Schools
 Douglas County School District (The Rocking Horse neighborhood is located within this district)
 DSST Public Schools
 Brighton Public Schools (The Highpoint at DIA neighborhood is located in this district)
 Christ Our Redeemer Lutheran School

Post-secondary and career education:
 Columbia College–Aurora
 University of Colorado Denver at the Anschutz Medical Campus
 Colorado Community College System
 Community College of Aurora
 Pickens Technical College
For-profit schools
 Anthem College
 Colorado School of Holistic and Naturopathic Studies
 Colorado Technical University South Denver Campus
 Concorde Career College
 Everest College
 Platt College

Media

Transportation

Aurora straddles Interstate 70, Interstate 225 and the E-470 beltway. The Regional Transportation District's light rail transit system was extended to serve the southwestern edge of Aurora on November 17, 2006. The H Line stops at Aurora's Dayton and Nine Mile Stations; a comprehensive network of feeder buses in southern Aurora serve the latter. On February 24, 2017, the line was extended as the R Line to Peoria Station in the city's northwest, where riders may transfer to the A Line providing service between Union Station in downtown Denver and Denver International Airport (DIA). Much of Aurora is more convenient to DIA than Denver itself, and the city is planning an aerotropolis along the airport's southern flank. This proximity is a factor in the expected growth of the E-470 corridor directly south of DIA, projected to eventually accommodate 250,000 additional Aurora residents. The easternmost portions of Aurora adjoin the Colorado Air and Space Port.

In 2017, Aurora became the first city in Colorado to host a dockless bike sharing program.

Sports
In 2014 the U.S.A. Powerlifting Raw Nationals and the IPF Open Powerlifting World Championships were both held in Aurora. The WC was the 35th Women and 44th Men open Powerlifting Championships, and it was held on the Radisson Hotel Denver Southeast.

Notable people

Some notable individuals who were born in or have lived in Aurora include:

 Lauren Boebert, U.S. Representative for Colorado's 3rd congressional district
 J. Scott Campbell, comic book artist
 Danny Dietz, former Navy SEAL killed in Operation Red Wings, recipient of the Navy Cross
 John Kerry, U.S. Senator and Secretary of State
 Jennifer Ketcham, former pornographic actress with the stage name Penny Flame 
Joe Neguse, U.S. Representative
 Brendan Schaub, former mixed martial arts fighter, comedian and broadcaster
 Dan Soder, stand-up comedian
 Michelle Waterson, mixed martial arts fighter
 Bowen Yang, SNL cast member
 Michael Chiesa, UFC fighter

Sister cities
Aurora's sister cities are:
 Adama, Ethiopia (1988–2004, since 2014)
 Jacó, Costa Rica (2016)
 Seongnam, South Korea (1992)

Friendship cities
Aurora also has one friendship city:
 Antiguo Cuscatlán, El Salvador (2016)

See also

Colorado
Bibliography of Colorado
Index of Colorado-related articles
Outline of Colorado
List of counties in Colorado
List of municipalities in Colorado
List of places in Colorado
List of statistical areas in Colorado
Front Range Urban Corridor
North Central Colorado Urban Area
Denver-Aurora, CO Combined Statistical Area
Denver-Aurora-Lakewood, CO Metropolitan Statistical Area
Aurora Sentinel, the local newspaper

Notes

References

Bibliography

External links

City of Aurora official website
Aurora Chamber of Commerce
Visit Aurora
CDOT map of the City of Aurora

 
Cities in Arapahoe County, Colorado
Cities in Adams County, Colorado
Cities in Colorado
Denver metropolitan area
Populated places established in 1891
Cities in Douglas County, Colorado
1891 establishments in Colorado